In compiler theory, a reaching definition for a given instruction is an earlier instruction whose target variable can reach (be assigned to) the given one without an intervening assignment. For example, in the following code:

 d1 : y := 3
 d2 : x := y

d1 is a reaching definition for d2. In the following, example, however:

 d1 : y := 3
 d2 : y := 4
 d3 : x := y

d1 is no longer a reaching definition for d3, because d2 kills its reach:  the value defined in d1 is no longer available and cannot reach d3.

As analysis

The similarly named reaching definitions is a data-flow analysis which statically determines which definitions may reach a given point in the code. Because of its simplicity, it is often used as the canonical example of a data-flow analysis in textbooks.  The data-flow confluence operator used is set union, and the analysis is forward flow. Reaching definitions are used to compute use-def chains.

The data-flow equations used for a given basic block  in reaching definitions are:

 
 

In other words, the set of reaching definitions going into  are all of the reaching definitions from 's predecessors, .   consists of all of the basic blocks that come before  in the control-flow graph.

  , a set of locally available definitions in a basic block 
 , a set of definitions (not locally available, but in the rest of the program) killed by definitions in the basic block. 

where  is the set of all definitions that assign to the variable . Here  is a unique label attached to the assigning instruction; thus, the domain of values in reaching definitions are these instruction labels.

Worklist algorithm
Reaching definition is usually calculated using an iterative worklist algorithm. 

Input: control-flow graph CFG = (Nodes, Edges, Entry, Exit)
// Initialize
for all CFG nodes n in N,
    OUT[n] = emptyset; // can optimize by OUT[n] = GEN[n];

// put all nodes into the changed set
// N is all nodes in graph,
Changed = N;

// Iterate 
while (Changed != emptyset)
{
    choose a node n in Changed;
    // remove it from the changed set
    Changed = Changed -{ n };

    // init IN[n] to be empty
    IN[n] = emptyset;

    // calculate IN[n] from predecessors' OUT[p]
    for all nodes p in predecessors(n)
         IN[n] = IN[n] Union OUT[p];

    oldout = OUT[n]; // save old OUT[n]
    
    // update OUT[n] using transfer function f_n
    OUT[n] = GEN[n] Union (IN[n] -KILL[n]);

    // any change to OUT[n] compared to previous value?
    if (OUT[n] changed) // compare oldout vs. OUT[n]
    {    
        // if yes, put all successors of n into the changed set
        for all nodes s in successors(n)
             Changed = Changed U { s };
    }
}

See also

 Dead-code elimination
 Loop-invariant code motion
 Reachable uses
 Static single assignment form

Further reading

Data-flow analysis
Program analysis